CIAS can refer to

 Canadian International Air Show
 Canadian International AutoShow
 Center for Infrastructure Assurance and Security at the University of Texas at San Antonio
 Changi International Airport Services
 College of Imaging Arts and Sciences at Rochester Institute of Technology